Béla Zsitnik (17 December 1924 – 12 January 2019) was a Hungarian rower who competed in the 1948, 1952, and 1960 Summer Olympics.

Early life 
He was born in Győr and is the father of Béla Zsitnik Jr. In 1948 he was a crew member of the Hungarian boat which won the bronze in the coxed pairs event. Four years later he was eliminated with the Hungarian boat in the semi-final repechage of the eight competition. At the 1960 Games he was part of the Hungarian boat which was eliminated in the repechage of the coxless four event.

References

External links 
 
 
 

1924 births
2019 deaths
Hungarian male rowers
Olympic rowers of Hungary
Rowers at the 1948 Summer Olympics
Rowers at the 1952 Summer Olympics
Rowers at the 1960 Summer Olympics
Olympic bronze medalists for Hungary
Olympic medalists in rowing
Medalists at the 1948 Summer Olympics
Sportspeople from Győr